Charles Waldron (December 24, 1874 – March 4, 1946) was an American stage and film actor, sometimes credited as Charles Waldron Sr., Chas. Waldron Sr., Charles D. Waldron or Mr. Waldron.

Early life
He was born and grew up in Waterford, New York. His parents, Mr. and Mrs. George B. Waldron, were themselves actors of some note, but they did not want their son to follow in their profession and tried to steer him to a career in finance. He worked in Philadelphia as a bank clerk. However, he jumped at the chance to "play the juvenile lead in Kidnapped".

Career

Nine years of stock and a tour of Australia and New Zealand performing in The Virginian and The Squaw Man followed. In 1905, he was praised for his performance in the leading role in the play The Eternal City at San Francisco's Alcazar Theatre. He made his Broadway debut in 1907 in David Belasco's The Warrens of Virginia. (His father and Belasco had been fellow actors in a Portland, Oregon company.) From 1907 to 1946, he acted in more than 40 Broadway productions in New York City. He played the title role in the original 1914 production of Daddy Long Legs, opposite future film star Ruth Chatterton; both he and Chatterton were highly praised. He performed alongside his son, Charles Belasco Jr., in the latter's debut in Lucrece c. 1932.

Over his long career, he appeared in more than 60 films, starting with the silent film Big Noise Hank (1911). He played U.S. President James Monroe in The Monroe Doctrine, a short film released in 1939.  He is perhaps best known for his final film role, that of General Sternwood in the opening scenes of The Big Sleep (1946), starring Humphrey Bogart and Lauren Bacall.

Death
Waldron died, aged 71, in Hollywood, California. He was buried in Forest Lawn Memorial Park in Glendale, California.

Partial filmography

Big Noise Hank (1911 short) - Julius Jones
When We Were Twenty-One (1915) - Dick Carew
Esmerelda (1915 short) - David Hardy
At Bay (1915) - Capt. Holbrook
Mice and Men (1916) - Mark Embury
Audrey (1916) - Lord Haward
Everyman's Price (1921) - Bruce Steele
Wanderer of the Wasteland (1935) - Mr. Virey
Mary Burns, Fugitive (1935) - District Attorney
Crime and Punishment (1935) - University president
The Great Impersonation (1935) - Sir Ivan Brunn
Ramona (1936) - Dr. Weaver
The Garden of Allah (1936) - Abbe of Monastery (uncredited)
Career Woman (1936) - Milt Clark
A Doctor's Diary (1937) - Dr. Ellery Stanwood
The Emperor's Candlesticks (1937) - Dr. Malchor - a Conspirator
It's All Yours (1937) - Alexander Duncan
Escape by Night (1937) - Pop Adams
 It's All Yours (1937) - Mr. Warfield
Madame X (1937) - President of Court (uncredited)
Navy Blue and Gold (1937) - Cmdr. Carter
They're Always Caught (1938 short) - Mayor Fletcher
Marie Antoinette (1938) - Swedish Ambassador (uncredited)
The Little Adventuress (1938) - Herkimer Gould
Kentucky (1938) - Thad Goodwin - 1938
On Borrowed Time (1939) - Reverend Murdock
The Real Glory (1939) - The Padre
The Monroe Doctrine (1939 short) - President James Monroe
Remember the Night (1940) - Judge in New York
Women Without Names (1940) - Curtis Lawson (uncredited)
And One Was Beautiful (1940) - Stephen Harridge
Dr. Kildare's Strange Case (1940) - Dr. 'Egghead' Squires, Messinger Inst.
Edison, the Man (1940) - First Commissioner (uncredited)
Untamed (1940) - Doctor Hughes
Three Faces West (1940) - Dr. William Thorpe
Sailor's Lady (1940) - Commander-in-Chief (uncredited)
Stranger on the Third Floor (1940) - District Attorney
Street of Memories (1940) - Richard Havens
The Son of Monte Cristo (1940) - Kurt Mirbach
The Case of the Black Parrot (1941) - Paul Vantine
Tobacco Road (1941) - Mr. Lester (scenes cut)
I Wanted Wings (1941) - Commanding Officer (uncredited)
The Devil and Miss Jones (1941) - Needles
The Nurse's Secret (1941) - Dr. Stewart
Three Sons o' Guns (1941) - Henry Gresham
Rise and Shine (1941) - President
Thru Different Eyes (1942) - Doctor Whittier
The Gay Sisters (1942) - Mr. Van Rennseler
Random Harvest (1942) - Mr. Lloyd
The Song of Bernadette (1943) - Bishop of Tarbes (uncredited)
The Adventures of Mark Twain (1944) - Dr. Quintard (uncredited)
The Black Parachute (1944) - Erik Dundeen (uncredited)
Once Upon a Time (1944) - Preacher (uncredited)
Wing and a Prayer (1944) - Admiral (uncredited)
Mademoiselle Fifi (1944) - The Curé of Cleresville
Rhapsody in Blue (1945) - Doctor (uncredited)
The Fighting Guardsman (1946) - Monsignor at Inn (uncredited)
Blonde Alibi (1946) - Ship's Officer (uncredited)
Dragonwyck (1946) - Farmer (uncredited)
The Big Sleep (1946) - General Sternwood (final film role)

Broadway credits

 The Warrens of Virginia (1907)
 The Fourth Estate (1909)
 Mid-Channel (1909)
 Judith Zaraine (1911)
 June Madness (1912)
 The High Road (1912)
 The Painted Woman (1913)
 The Strange Woman (1913)
 The Dragon's Claw (1914)
 Daddy Long Legs (1914)
 The Woman in Room 13 (1919)
 The Passion Flower (1920)
 Mary Stuart / A Man About Town (1921)
 Swords (1921)
 The Elton Case (1921)
 A Bill of Divorcement (1921)
 A Pinch Hitter (1922)
 The Guilty One (1923)
 Mrs. Partridge Presents (1925)
 Hamlet (1925)
 Magda (1926)
 Pyramids (1926)
 The Heaven Tappers (1927)
 Madame X (1927)
 Coquette (1927)
 Those We Love (1930)
 The Vikings (1930)
 The Barretts of Wimpole Street (1931)
 Electra (1932)
 Lucrece (1932)
 Alien Corn (1933)
 The Pursuit of Happiness (1933)
 Dance With Your Gods (1934)
 Romeo and Juliet (1934)
 The Barretts of Wimpole Street (1935)
 Flowers of the Forest (1935)
 Romeo and Juliet (1935)
 Saint Joan (1936)
 I Am My Youth (1938)
 American Landscape (1938)
 Deep Are the Roots (1945)

References

External links

1874 births
1946 deaths
American male film actors
American male silent film actors
American male stage actors
Male actors from Hollywood, Los Angeles
People from Waterford, New York
Burials at Forest Lawn Memorial Park (Glendale)
20th-century American male actors